Chionochloa howensis  is a species of grass in the family Poaceae. The specific epithet derives from the name of the island to which it is endemic. The species was first discovered by John Pickard in 1970. Its affinities lie with Chionochloa flavicans of New Zealand and not with Australian species of Chionochloa.

Description
It is an erect perennial grass, growing to about 1 m in height. The leaf blade is 60 cm or more long and 12 mm wide; it is flat, strongly ribbed, and scabrous on the upper surface.

Distribution and habitat
The grass is endemic to Australia’s subtropical Lord Howe Island in the Tasman Sea; it is known only from the cliffs of Mounts Lidgbird and Gower at the southern end of the island.

References

howensis
Endemic flora of Lord Howe Island
Plants described in 1988